Tongan Americans are Americans who can trace their ancestry to Tonga, officially known as the Kingdom of Tonga. There are approximately 57,000 Tongans and Tongan Americans living in the United States, as of 2012. Tongans are considered to be Pacific Islanders in the United States Census, and are the country's fourth largest Pacific Islander American group in terms of population, after Native Hawaiians, Samoan Americans, and Guamanian/Chamorro Americans.

If the Tongan American population includes people living in America Samoa, there would be up to an additional 16,000 (some America Samoan residents are U.S. residents), there would be about 85,000 Tongan Americans, as of 2019.  There are 67,221 people of Tongan descent living in the U.S., including those of partial ancestry, as per the 2019 U.S. Census estimates.

History 
The Tongans have emigrated to the United States or its territories since 1916, when some people of this island immigrated to Laie, a census-designated place in Hawaii, which was then an American territory but not yet a state. Later, in 1924 and 1936 two more Tongans emigrated to the United States, specifically to Utah, with an American Mormon who served as a missionary in Tonga (although the first of them only accompanied to mentioned Mormon, since he only migrated to the USA to study there), while in 1956 the first Tongan family living in the United States was settled in Salt Lake City. However, it was not until the end of World War II when many more Tongans immigrated to the United States. Most of them were missionaries, who emigrated to the United States to work in several religious and cultural centers. Many other Tongans emigrated to the United States in the 50s. Since then, the number of Tongans to emigrate to the USA increased each decade: In the 60s emigrated more of 110 Tongans to the USA and in the 1970s emigrated more of 940 Tongans. The number was especially notable in the 80's and 90's. In this last decade emigrated over 1,900 Tongans to the USA. This is because the number of lands are limited on their country and not everyone has been able to get one, and jobs were scarce.   By 1980, 6,200 people of this origin were living in the US, and by in 1990 that number had increased to  17,600.  By 2000, there were 31,891 people of Tongan origin living in the United States.

Demographics
Tongan immigration has been favored primarily by the Church of Jesus Christ of Latter-day Saints (LDS Church), who help them obtain visas (both studies and work) and employment and even they help them to get couples, when they are in marriageable age.

California
California has 26,000 Tongan Americans including those of mixed ethnicity, comprising 0.06% of the state's population. About 19,000 were Tongan alone: 0.05%. The San Francisco Bay Area has the largest Tongan population in California and amongst the largest nationwide along with the Salt Lake City, Utah area, with an estimated population of 5,000 in San Mateo County alone (0.6%), concentrated especially in the city of East Palo Alto (8.3%). Within San Mateo County, the city of San Mateo (1.2%), San Bruno, and South San Francisco have sizable Tongan populations. Other Bay Area cities with significant Tongan populations include the East Bay cities of Oakland (0.3% Tongan), especially in the San Antonio area. San Leandro, Concord, and Pittsburg. Smaller communities can be found in Santa Clara County, mainly in Mountain View. There are around 1,000 Tongans in Sacramento and more throughout the Sacramento Valley.

Other cities with significant but small Tongan American communities exist within Southern California. The Greater Los Angeles Area city of Inglewood (0.4% or less), Hawthorne (0.4% or less), and the Inland Empire sub-region. Long Beach, California is home to 600 Tongans, 0.1% of the city's population. In the city of Los Angeles itself, there are about 1,000 Tongans or part-Tongan people, less than 0.05% of LA’s population. There are two Tongan churches in South Los Angeles, within the Vermont Vista area, where the schools are roughly 1-2% Pacific Islander, which may mainly consist of Samoans and Tongans. There is also a Tongan church in Pomona.

Utah
The state of Utah has a large presence of Tongan Americans, and a significant Pacific Islander population in general. Utah has the highest population of Tongan Americans in the United States. There are over 18,330 Tongan Americans in Utah, including those of mixed ethnicity, making up 0.6% of the state population. Tongans first started immigrating to Utah because of their attraction to the abundant amount of LDS congregations in the state. As of 2011, Utah has around 30 branches of Tongan Latter-day Saint churches. About one of four people of Tongan descent living in the U.S. live in Utah. Salt Lake County has more than 9,000 Tongan Americans in residence. At least 2,000 people of Tongan descent live in Salt Lake City alone, making up one percent of the city's population. West Valley City has 3,200 Tongans, making 2.4% of the city's population.

Texas, other U.S. states
Euless, Texas has a sizable Tongan community. At least ten Tongan churches are present in Euless. Trinity High School is also well known in the local area for their tradition of beginning Friday night football games with the culture's traditional war cry, the Kailao. As of 2020, Euless is about 2% Pacific Islander, and home to over 500 Tongans, almost 1% of the city. 

There are 500 people of Tongan descent living in Portland, Oregon (0.1% of the city's population). There are over 1,000 Tongans in the Seattle metropolitan area, mainly in the White Center area, which is at least 2% Tongan. 

Anchorage, Alaska (0.3%); Kona, Hawaii; Lahaina, Hawaii, and Reno, Nevada. Hawaii has the largest percentage or second highest, after Utah, of Tongan Americans, with 8,496 people of Tongan descent, making up 0.6% of Hawaiian residents. There are 1,000 Tongans in Honolulu, 0.3% of the city.

Notable people

 Professional golfer Tony Finau
 NFL player Haloti Ngata
 BYU Head Football Coach Kalani Sitake
 Singer Dinah Jane
 NFL player Vita Vea
  The Jets singer
 NFL player, television news reporter Vai Sikahema

See also 
 Tongan Australians
 Tongan New Zealanders
 Tonga–United States relations

References

External links 
 Tonga: Migration and the Homeland
Tongan American aims to eliminate stereotypes, promote wellness within Pacific Islander community

American people of Tongan descent
Oceanian American
Pacific Islands American
Tongan American